Shorea multiflora (called, along with some other species in the genus Shorea, yellow meranti) is a species of tree in the family Dipterocarpaceae. It is native to Sumatra, Peninsular Malaysia and Borneo.

References

multiflora
Trees of Sumatra
Trees of Peninsular Malaysia
Trees of Borneo
Taxonomy articles created by Polbot
Taxa named by William Burck